Mount Verlautz is a mountain (2,490 m) standing just north of the mouth of Poulter Glacier in the southeast end of the Rawson Mountains, Queen Maud Mountains. It was named by the Advisory Committee on Antarctic Names (US-ACAN) for Major Sidney J. Verlautz, U.S. Army Transportation Corps, who served as logistics research officer on the staff of the Commander, U.S. Naval Support Force, Antarctica.

Mountains of the Ross Dependency
Amundsen Coast